Hooversburg was a community, now extinct, in Perry Township, Miami County, in the U.S. state of Indiana.

History
A post office was established at Hooversburg in 1872, and remained in operation until it was discontinued in 1901. The community served as a trading point in Perry Township's early history, and was likely named after the Hoover family of settlers.

References

External links
 

Geography of Miami County, Indiana
Ghost towns in Indiana